Melanie Ruth Blatt (born 25 March 1975) is an English singer. She rose to fame in 1997 as a member of the girl group All Saints. The group have gained five number one singles, two multi-platinum albums, two BRIT Awards and have sold over 10 million records worldwide.

Blatt began recording a solo album in 2003, working with numerous producers including Xenomania and released her debut solo single "Do Me Wrong" in 2003. Blatt was later dropped by her record label, and her solo album was cancelled. In 2005, she made a return to music with her single "See Me", and began recording another album independently which was later shelved and cancelled in favour of the All Saints reunion. In 2013 and 2015, she was a judge on the television series The X Factor NZ.

Early life 
Blatt was born at University College Hospital in the London Borough of Camden and is named after American folk singer Melanie Safka. She has a French mother and a British father, David Blatt (known also as author of the book Manchester United Ruined My Wife), whose ancestors were from Poland and Russia and a younger sister named Jasmine. She was brought up in both the UK and France. In 1986, Blatt was diagnosed as having scoliosis. Since her parents were not satisfied with the treatment for the condition in the United Kingdom they decided to move to France, where a specialist inserted three metal rods in her back.

Blatt went to Fitzjohn's Primary School where her musical talent was immediately noticed by the music teacher David Joyner, who encouraged her parents to send her to a stage school. In 1986, she attended the Sylvia Young Theatre School where she met Nicole Appleton. The two girls became best friends. During this period, Blatt also played young Eponine in Les Misérables for six months, and was the understudy for Cosette together with fellow Sylvia Young student Denise van Outen.

Career

1993–2001: Career with All Saints 

In 1993, Blatt sang under the name Melanie Guillaume in the band Drive with Julienne Davis. They released one single, "Curfew", together. She also did backing vocals for Dreadzone with Denise van Outen. Later that year, Blatt met Shaznay Lewis at the Metamorphosis recording studio in All Saints Road, London. Together, with Simone Rainford, they formed the group All Saints 1.9.7.5 which was later renamed to All Saints when Rainford left and Nicole and Natalie Appleton joined Blatt and Lewis.

In 1997 All Saints released their debut single "I Know Where It's At", and peaked at number 4 in the UK. The same year the group released a second single "Never Ever, which introduced the group to international success after topping the charts in the UK and Australia, and reaching the top ten across Europe, Canada and the United States. The single sold over 1.2 million copies in the United Kingdom and was certified double platinum by the British Phonographic Industry. The same year the group released their debut album All Saints, it reached number two in the United Kingdom and was certified platinum five times for sales of 1.5 million. The group gained a further two number one singles the following year: "Under the Bridge / Lady Marmalade" and "Bootie Call". In 2000 the group released new single "Pure Shores", which was used in the film The Beach and reached number one in the UK. The single was certified platinum for sales over 600,000 copies. The single was followed by their fifth number one single "Black Coffee", their second album Saints & Sinners was released shortly after and topped the chart in the United Kingdom. The album was eventually certified double platinum by the BPI for sales over 600,000. In early 2001, following the release of their single "All Hooked Up", the group split and reasons for this were later explained by Shaznay Lewis, who revealed details of tensions between the group.

In 2000, Blatt appeared in the film Honest directed by Dave Stewart opposite Nicole and Natalie Appleton and in 2001 she played a small role in the independent British film Dog Eat Dog.

2002–2006: Solo musical releases 
Blatt's solo releases were of variable success; her most prominent being "TwentyFourSeven", a collaboration with the Artful Dodger, peaking at No 6 in September 2001. Melanie began recording on her debut solo album in 2002, working with numerous producers including Sony Music production team Xenomania. In late 2003 she released her debut single "Do Me Wrong", it reached number 18 in the UK and led to Blatt being dropped by her label due to its low charting. The album she was working on was scrapped, therefore the release of her upcoming single "Blue" was cancelled, but later included on British singer Amelia Lily's debut album Be a Fighter, on which she worked with Xenomania. In 2005 Blatt made a return to music with new single "See Me", which was used in the Robots movie. She began working on a new album with independent label Sowlen Ankle Ltd written with, and recorded by, Matt Hales from Aqualung. During 2005, Blatt played small venues in the UK which featured songs from the album she was working on at the time and included unreleased songs like "In Your Arms," "I Don't Mind," "Now You're Gone," "No Lullaby" and "Love Sweet Love." Blatt's solo record was shelved in favour of the All Saints reunion.

2006–2007: All Saints reunion 
On 24 January 2006, it was announced that the band had reformed and signed a record deal with Parlophone. They subsequently began work on their third studio album, Studio 1. The first single, "Rock Steady" (released in November 2006), reached number three on the UK Singles Chart. Studio 1 entered the albums chart at number forty and sold 60,000 copies according to the BPI, being certified silver. A second single, "Chick Fit" failed to reach the top 200. Blatt discussed the reunion's failure in an interview with i-D magazine in 2012: "I don't think it was done for the right reasons... I know that I did it for the money. We got signed before we had even made music again, it wasn't like we felt we had something to give back to the world... we were given an opportunity and took it, without really thinking about it too hard". She also said she never felt comfortable with the success the band had and that "it was not necessarily the plan at the beginning; there was a lot of compromise involved".

2007–2014: Television 
Since 2007 Blatt presents the TV show The Hot Desk on ITV2 with co-hosts Nicole Appleton, Dave Berry, Emma Willis and Jayne Sharp. Between 2009 and 2010 she was reporter of Angela Griffin's show Angela and Friends. In January 2013 it was announced Melanie Blatt would join Daniel Bedingfield, Stan Walker and Ruby Frost as a judge/mentor on the New Zealand version of The X Factor: "I can't wait to see what kind of artists and voices we are going to find in New Zealand." Blatt mentored the Groups category. It was reported that she and her daughter Lilyella will live in the country for the duration of the series. In February 2013, Blatt revealed she is "making music" and when asked about a solo comeback she said she is going to do something she never thought in a million years she would do.

On 11 September 2014 MediaWorks announced both Blatt and Stan Walker would return to judge the second season of the X Factor NZ alongside returning host Dominic Bowden. Blatt and Walker would be joined by new husband-wife duo Willy Moon and Natalia Kills until their sacking, and replaced by Natalie Bassingthwaite and Shelton Woolwright. Blatt mentored the Over 25's and placed 5th with her contestant Steve Broad.

2014–present: Second All Saints reunion 
In 2014, All Saints reformed to support the Backstreet Boys for five dates across the UK and Ireland in 2014. On 27 January 2016, it was confirmed that All Saints will release their fourth studio album Red Flag on 8 April 2016. The lead single from the album, "One Strike", preceded the album on 26 February 2016.

Personal life 
On 20 November 1998 Blatt gave birth to daughter Lilyella, whose father is Stuart Zender, Jamiroquai's former bass player. They broke up in early 2006.

Filmography

Discography

Singles

Featured singles

References

External links 
 
 
 

1975 births
Living people
All Saints (group) members
English film actresses
People from Camden Town
English people of French descent
English people of Polish descent
English people of Russian descent
Alumni of the Sylvia Young Theatre School
English women pop singers
Feminist musicians
English expatriates in New Zealand